Finer Things may refer to:

 "Finer Things" (DJ Felli Fel song), 2008
 "Finer Things" (Polo G song), 2018
 The Finer Things, compilation album box set by Steve Winwood, 1995
 The Finer Things (album), album by State Champs, 2013
 "The Finer Things" (song), by Steve Winwood, 1987